Operation Light was a British naval operation in World War II under the command of Rear Admiral Clement Moody. The objective was to carry out aerial strikes on Japanese positions in Sigli, Northern Sumatra, Indonesia, and aerial reconnaissance over the Nicobar Islands, from 16–23 September 1944. The operation was scheduled to coincide with the Allied landing at Morotai, designated Operation Tradewind, as well as the U.S. 1st Marine Division's landing at Peleliu.

Operational detail

The raid saw a number of problems. First, due to technical inefficiencies of the aircraft carriers, the Victorious was only able to launch 22 aircraft, and the Indomitable took "forty minutes and two separate deckloads to dispatch just eighteen aircraft." Secondly, "the Fleet Air Arm crews suffered from a lack of target intelligence, a consequence of the lack of very long range (V.L.R.) reconnaissance aircraft based in India and Ceylon." One report of the raid states that "After the attack, the fighters roamed the area looking for the most impressive buildings in the area. These would then be machine gunned in the hope that the Japanese overlords were in residence."

References

World War II operations and battles of the Southeast Asia Theatre
World War II aerial operations and battles of the Pacific theatre
Aerial operations and battles of World War II involving the United Kingdom
Naval battles and operations of World War II involving the United Kingdom